St Mark's West Essex Catholic School is a Roman Catholic secondary school and sixth form with academy status located in Harlow, Essex, England.

The school has six forms in each secondary year, each containing 20-30 students, with each form named after one of six historical Catholic figures (Bede, Elgar, Fisher, Hume, More, Newman). St Mark's teaches years 7–13, and was the only sixth form in Harlow until the opening of Sir Frederick Gibberd College in September 2021.

St Mark's celebrated its 50th anniversary in 2015, and has consistently been one of the best performing schools in Essex under official Ofsted reports.

Headteachers 
Although the school has been in operation since 1965, it is notable for having only had 4 headteachers serve it in its history. The most recent headteacher, Elaine Heaphy, has announced her retirement at the end of the 2022 to 2023 academic year.

List of Headteachers at St Mark's West Essex Catholic School:

 Anthony O'Shea (1965 –1982)
 Brian Quinn (1982 –1994)
 David Brunwin (1994 - 2011)
 Elaine Heaphy (2011 – 2023)

See also
List of schools in Essex

References

External links
School website

Academies in Harlow
Catholic secondary schools in the Diocese of Brentwood
Secondary schools in Harlow